This is a list of Canadian soccer clubs in international competitions. Canadian clubs have participated in competitive international soccer competitions since at least 1975 when the Serbian White Eagles entered the 1975 CONCACAF Champions' Cup.

No Canadian team has won any CONCACAF competition, but in 2015 and in 2018, CF Montréal (then the Montreal Impact) and Toronto FC, respectively, reached the finals of the CONCACAF Champions League, losing both times. Toronto FC lost the 2018 edition of the Campeones Cup.

Qualification for CONCACAF competitions 
Starting in 2023, three Canadian clubs will qualify each season for the next edition of the CONCACAF Champions League:
 The Canadian Championship champion
 The Canadian Premier League champion
 The Canadian Premier League regular season winner

If a CPL club were to hold multiple qualification slots, then the next CPL club(s) with the most regular season league points would earn the remaining slot(s). If the Canadian Championship winner were to hold multiple qualification slots, then the runner-up would fill the slot; should the runner-up hold multiple qualification slots, then the highest ranked Canadian Championship semifinalist would earn the slot.

Cups and finals

CONCACAF Champions' Cup / Champions League

Campeones Cup

Full international record

CONCACAF Champions' Cup / Champions League

Leagues Cup

CONCACAF League

Campeones Cup

Pepsi Cup

Professional Cup

Appearances in CONCACAF competitions

Notes

See also 
 MLS performance in the CONCACAF Champions League

References

External links 
RSSSF

North American football clubs in international competitions
Canadian soccer club statistics